Andvord Bay is a bay-like fjord,  long and  wide, which lies between Beneden Head and Duthiers Point along the west coast of Graham Land.

It was discovered by the Belgian Antarctic Expedition, 1897–99, under Adrien de Gerlache, and named by him for Rolf Andvord, Belgian consul at Christiania (Oslo) at that time.

A popular cruise-ship destination is Neko Harbour, which was discovered by Belgian explorer Adrien de Gerlache in the early 20th century.  It was named for a Scottish whaling boat, the Neko, which operated in the area between 1911 and 1924.

FjordEco Scientific Expedition 
"Fjord Ecosystem (FjordEco) Structure and Function on the West Antarctica Peninsula – Hotspots of Productivity and Biodiversity?" is an integrated field and modeling study which aims to evaluate physical oceanographic processes, glacial inputs, plankton dynamics, and benthic community structure and function in Andvord Bay.
Christensen, K., 2017. The Upper Layer Structure and Variability of an Antarctic Glacio-marine Fjord: Andvord Bay, Western Antarctic Peninsula.
Cusick, A.M., Gilmore, R., Bombosch, A., Mascioni, M., Almandoz, G.O. and Vernet, M., 2020. Polar tourism as an effective research tool. Oceanography, 33(1), pp.50-61.
Eidam, E.F., Nittrouer, C.A., Lundesgaard, Ø., Homolka, K.K. and Smith, C.R., 2019. Variability of sediment accumulation rates in an Antarctic fjord. Geophysical Research Letters, 46(22), pp.13271-13280.
Ekern, L., 2017. Assessing seasonal primary production in Andvord Bay, Antarctica (Master thesis, UC San Diego).
Forsch, K., Hahn-Woernle, L., Sherrell, R., Roccanova, J., Bu, K., Burdige, D., Vernet, M. and Barbeau, K.A., 2021. Seasonal dispersal of fjord meltwaters as an important source of iron to coastal Antarctic phytoplankton. Biogeosciences Discussions, pp.1-49.
Hahn-Woernle, L., Powell, B., Lundesgaard, Ø. and van Wessem, M., 2020. Sensitivity of the summer upper ocean heat content in a Western Antarctic Peninsula fjord. Progress in Oceanography, 183, p.102287.
Hamilton, M., 2021. The Molecular Diversity and Physiology of Polar Phytoplankton (Doctoral dissertation, University of California, Santa Cruz).
Lewis, M., 2018. Assessing the down-fjord mechanistic relationships of biodiversity and abundance of Antarctic benthic macrofauna of Andvord Bay (Doctoral dissertation, University of Hawaiʻi at Mānoa).
Lundesgaard, Ø., 2018. Physical processes in a Western Antarctic Peninsula fjord (Doctoral dissertation, University of Hawai'i at Manoa).
 Lundesgaard, Ø., B. Powell, M. Merrifield, L. Hahn-Woernle, and P. Winsor, 2019, Response of an Antarctic Peninsula Fjord to Summer Katabatic Wind Events, J. Phys. Oceanogr., 49, 1485–1502, https://doi.org/10.1175/JPO-D-18-0119.1
 Mascioni, M., Almandoz, G.O., Ekern, L., Pan, B.J. and Vernet, M., 2021. Microplanktonic diatom assemblages dominated the primary production but not the biomass in an Antarctic fjord. Journal of Marine Systems, 224, p.103624.
Pan, B.J., 2020. The Impact of Seasonal Environmental Variables on Phytoplankton Ecology at the Antarctic Ice-Ocean Boundary: Studies Through Field Work, Numerical Models, Data Science, and Machine Learning. University of California, San Diego.
Pan, B.J., Vernet, M., Manck, L., Forsch, K., Ekern, L., Mascioni, M., Barbeau, K, Almandoz, G., and Orona, A.J., 2020, Environmental Drivers of Phytoplankton Taxonomic Composition in an Antarctic Fjord, Progress in Oceanography, 183, 102295, https://doi.org/10.1016/j.pocean.2020.102295
 Pan, B.J., Vernet, M., Reynolds, R.A., and Mitchell, B.G., 2020, The optical and biological properties of glacial meltwater in an Antarctic fjord, PLoS ONE, 14, 2, https://doi.org/10.1371/journal.pone.0211107
Smith Craig, R., Vernet, M., Winsor, P., Lundesgaard, O., Powell, B., Truffer, M., Merrifield, M., Sweetman, A., Nunnally, C., Ziegler, A. and Lewis, M., 2017, July. Multi-disciplinary studies of Andvord Bay indicate katabatic wind forcing, pulses of export flux, and high food availability and benthic abundance in inner fjord basins. In Book of Abstracts (p. 429).
Ziegler, A.F., Cape, M., Lundesgaard, Ø. and Smith, C.R., 2020. Intense deposition and rapid processing of seafloor phytodetritus in a glaciomarine fjord, Andvord Bay (Antarctica). Progress in Oceanography, 187, p.102413.
 Ziegler, A.F., Smith, C.R., Edwards, K.F. and Vernet, M., 2017. Glacial dropstones: islands enhancing seafloor species richness of benthic megafauna in West Antarctic Peninsula fjords. Marine Ecology Progress Series, 583, pp.1-14.

See also 
Almirante Ice Fringe
Gerlache Strait Geology

Further reading 

 J. B. Anderson, Antarctic Marine Geology, pp. 126–129
 Reuters, ‘Artificial ice’ could save giant Antarctic ice sheet from collapsing, July 18, 2019
 Zhihua Zhang, Editor, ‘Artificial ice’ could save giant Antarctic ice sheet from collapsing,  2019 Feb 6.

References

External links 
 Andvord Bay on USGS website
 Andvord Bay on SCAR website
 Andvord Bay באתר marineregions
 Andvord Bay satellite image
 Andvord Bay water temperature, salinity, pressure database
 Andvord Bay long term updated weather forecast

Bays of Graham Land
Danco Coast